Arnold Line may refer to:

 Arnold Transit Company, a ferry boat company serving Mackinac Island in Michigan, also known as Arnold Line
 Arnold Line, Mississippi, Lamar County, Mississippi